Nathan Duane Whitaker Jr. (born June 23, 1959) is an American character actor.

Early life 
Whitaker was born in Abilene, Texas, the oldest child of Nathan Duane Whitaker Sr. and Barbara Ella Hudson, a nurse. He has two younger sisters, both born in Lubbock, Texas. Whitaker graduated from Monterey High School.

Career 
Whitaker is probably best known for his role in Quentin Tarantino's popular 1994 film Pulp Fiction as Maynard, the sadistic pawn shop owner. He wrote and portrayed the title role in Eddie Presley (based on his own successful stage play). Whitaker also wrote, directed and appeared in Together and Alone.

Other notable roles include; a racist cop in Tales from the Hood, Boss Man in Feast , The Sheriff in Trailer Park of Terror, Luther in From Dusk Till Dawn 2: Texas Blood Money (which he also co-wrote), Buddy in Dead Letters, Winslow in Broke Sky, Mickey in Cordoba Nights Dr. Bankhead in The Devil's Rejects and Road Rash in Hobgoblins.

Whitaker has appeared in the feature films Getting Grace, Give Till It Hurts, A Dark Foe, Night Club, Halloween II and Lionhead. On TV, Whitaker appeared on the Cold Case episode "The Brush Man" and filmed a recurring role in the FX series The Bridge. Whitaker has also written numerous screenplays including Stripteaser.

On March 31, 2010, American Cinematheque hosted a screening of Eddie Presley and "Together and Alone" at Grauman's Egyptian Theatre in Los Angeles. In 2016 "Together and Alone" was shown again through the American Cinemateque at the Spielberg Theater with Garrett Clancy's "Dead Letters". Whitaker has also taught acting classes in Los Angeles for over twenty years

Awards and nominations

Filmography

Film

Television

References

External links
 
Actor's home page

1959 births
Living people
American male film actors
American male television actors
People from Abilene, Texas
Male actors from Texas